= Aulichev =

Aulichev (Russian: Ауличев) is a Russian masculine surname, its feminine counterpart is Aulicheva. It originates from the Russian given name Vavula (Vavila).
